Gippsland Province was an electorate of the Victorian Legislative Council 
from November 1882 until 2006. It was based in the Gippsland region of Victoria, Australia.

Gippsland Province was created in the redistribution of provinces in 1882 when the Central and Eastern Provinces were abolished. The new Gippsland, North Central, South Yarra, North Yarra, South Eastern and Melbourne Provinces were then created.

Gippsland province was defined in The Legislative Council Act 1881 and consisted of the divisions of Buln Buln, Narracan and Traralgon, Alberton, Rosedale, Maffra, Avon, Bairnsdale, Omeo, Towong, Yackandandah, Wodonga, Wood's Point, Walhalla and Sale.

Gippsland Province was abolished from the 2006 state election in the wake of the Bracks Labor government's reform of the Legislative Council. The Eastern Victoria Region now covers much of the area of the old Gippsland Province.

Members for Gippsland Province
Three members were elected to the province initially; four from the expansion of the Council in 1889; 
two from the redistribution of 1904 when several new provinces including East Yarra and Melbourne East were created.

Election results

See also
 Electoral district of Gipps' Land (Victorian Legislative Council) (1851–1856)

References

Former electoral provinces of Victoria (Australia)
1882 establishments in Australia
2006 disestablishments in Australia